Rake is an Australian television program, produced by Essential Media and Entertainment, that first aired on the ABC TV in 2010.
It stars Richard Roxburgh as the rakish Cleaver Greene, a brilliant but self-destructive Sydney barrister, defending a usually guilty client. The show airs in the United States on DirecTV's Audience Network and was previously available on Netflix in the UK, Ireland, Canada, the United States, the Netherlands, Australia, New Zealand, South Africa, Czech Republic, Poland, and Thailand. The fifth and final series went into production in October 2017 and premiered on 19 August 2018.

Cast

Main cast
 Richard Roxburgh as Cleaver Greene, a brilliant but self-destructive criminal defence barrister. The character is loosely based on colourful Sydney barristers Mervyn Ward and Charles Waterstreet, and was named after Cleaver Bunton. At the end of the fourth series, he is elected to a seat as an independent senator. At the end of the fifth series, he is appointed Chief Justice of the High Court of Australia.
 Russell Dykstra as Barney "Barnyard" Meagher, one of Cleaver's instructing solicitors and his best friend. After Cleaver sleeps with his wife Scarlet, Barney feels betrayed and his relationships with both Cleaver and Scarlet are disrupted. In the second series, Barney begins an affair with Cleaver's secretary, Nicole. At the start of the third series, it is revealed that Barney and Nicole are having a child together, and that Barney is receiving treatment for testicular cancer.
 Danielle Cormack as Scarlet "Red" Engles SC, Barney's wife, a criminal prosecutions barrister. In the second series, she works part-time for Cal McGregor, the Attorney General, before returning to the bar as a criminal defence barrister in the third series. In addition to this, during the third series she has a short-lived affair with David Potter, another barrister with political ambitions, who is prosecuting Cleaver for non-payment of taxes. Scarlet succeeds in being promoted to Senior Counsel.
 Matt Day as David "Harry-Sorry, David" Potter, a tax lawyer prosecuting Cleaver Greene and attempting to get into politics with the help of Attorney General Joe Sandilands. In series 2, Potter is a member of the Parliament of New South Wales and of the Australian Labor Party and is Shadow Attorney General. In the third series, he has become the Leader of the NSW Australian Labor Party, and is having a secret affair with Scarlet. In the fourth series, he runs as a Senator for the Australian Greens.  David is nicknamed "Harry-Sorry, David" as a joke on the fact that he wears Harry Potter-styled glasses and his last name is Potter. 
 Adrienne Pickering as Melissa "Missy" Partridge, a former prostitute turned law student, caught between being Potter's girlfriend and helping Greene, a former client for whom she has developed feelings. By the end of the first series, she reveals her true identity as Jane Tanner (Turner) to Cleaver and David, and leave to travel around Europe. In series 2, she has written a book based on her life in prostitution under the name of "J.M. Doolan". In series 3, the book based on her life is made into a film. In series 4, she returns to Australia after a hiatus in America; she is addicted to a multitude of drugs and has to go through the process of removing the addiction of ice. In the end of series 4 she is pregnant with Finnegan Greene's child.
 Caroline Brazier as Wendy Greene, Cleaver's ex-wife, who is a psychologist in a hospital psychiatric ward. At the end of the second series, she starts dating Roger, an osteopath, and at the beginning of the third series she and Roger are engaged.
 Keegan Joyce as Finnegan "Fuzz" Greene, Cleaver and Wendy's teenage son, who often has sexual relationships with older women. By the end of the second series, he has started dating Tara, an evangelical Christian, and during the third series is planning on doing aid work in the Congo.
 Kate Box as Nicole Vargas, Cleaver's long-suffering secretary, who has a drunken one-night stand with Barney, days before her marriage. In the third series, she and Barney have a child out of wedlock.
 Damien Garvey as Cal McGregor, the successor of Joe Sandilands as Attorney General of New South Wales. He is corrupt and is sent to jail. He hates Cleaver because of an affair Cleaver had with Cal's ex-wife and former NSW Premier, Claudia McGregor, played by Toni Collette. Cal is released on parole at the start of the third series, and becomes a current affairs journalist and popular bombastic TV pundit.
 Geoff Morrell as Joe Sandilands, Labor Party Attorney General of New South Wales. After reports of himself being a regular customer of the brothel in which Missy worked, he commits suicide, and is replaced by corrupt Liberal politician Cal McGregor.
 Robyn Malcolm plays Kirsty Corella, wife of imprisoned crime boss Mick Corella, whom Cleaver defended. Cleaver owes huge gambling debts to Mick and then to Kirsty, who takes over as boss while Mick is in prison. During the second series, she briefly dates Cleaver, before falling in love with Col, her "enforcer," who frequently pays Cleaver visits to "persuade" him to pay his gambling debts.
 Steve Le Marquand as Col, Mick and Kirsty's henchman. He is in love with Kirsty and eventually enters a relationship with her, thanks to Cleaver's encouragement.
 Rhys Muldoon as Lincoln Lincoln, an incompetent solicitor who occasionally instructs on matters for Cleaver and Scarlet.

Guest cast

Series overview

Episodes

Season 1 (2010)

Season 2 (2012)

Season 3 (2014)

Season 4 (2016)

Season 5 (2018)

Ratings

Season 1 (2010)

Season 2 (2012)

Season 3 (2014)

Season 4 (2016)

Season 5 (2018)

Awards and nominations

American remake
The Fox Network in the US commissioned an American version, starring Greg Kinnear as the lead character, renamed Keegan Deane for American audiences. It aired between January and April 2014. Richard Roxburgh was a producer on the American version alongside Kinnear.

DVD rating
In Australia Rake was rated MA 15+. In New Zealand the first two series received a rating of R16 for sex scenes, violence, drug use and offensive language; series three was given a rating of R18 for violence, offensive language, drug use and sex scenes.

Soundtrack
Original music for the show is composed and performed by David McCormack (of Custard), Antony Partos and Michael Lira, at Sonar Music in Sydney. A soundtrack album Rake: Music from the TV Series was released through ABC Music in July 2016.

References

External links

 Rake homepage, ABC TV
 
 Rake at the Australian Television Information Archive

2010 Australian television series debuts
2018 Australian television series endings

APRA Award winners
Australian Broadcasting Corporation original programming
Australian comedy-drama television series
Australian legal television series
English-language television shows
Television shows set in Sydney
Audience (TV network) original programming